The Hawthorn Football Club are a professional Australian rules football team based in Mulgrave, Victoria, playing in the Australian Football League. The team began as the Mayblooms before changing their nickname to the Hawks in 1942.

Since joining the VFA in 1914, Hawthorn have had 33 coaches. The current coach of the club is Sam Mitchell, who took over from Alastair Clarkson ahead of the 2022 season. Clarkson is the most successful coach in the club's history having led the team for more games coached, home and away games coached, games won, home and away wins, finals games, finals wins, and VFL/AFL premierships.

VFA/VFL/AFL Mens coaches 

Note: Statistics correct as of the end of round 1, 2023.

AFL Women's coaches 
On 12 August 2021, Hawthorn was granted a license to join the AFL Women's league for the 2022/23 season. Bec Goddard who was in charge of the club's VFL women's side was immediately appointed as the club's first ever AFLW coach.

References 

 AFL Tables - Hawthorn coaches

Hawthorn Football Club coaches

Hawthorn Football Club coaches